A capote or capot is a long wrap-style wool coat with a hood.

From the early days of the North American fur trade, both indigenous peoples and European Canadian settlers fashioned wool blankets into "capotes" as a means of coping with harsh winters. The garments served as winter outerwear for First Nations, the habitants and voyageurs of New France, the Métis of the Red River Colony, and later the British settlers, traders, and trappers of British North America.

The Hudson’s Bay Company (HBC) sold capotes, called blanket coats, made out of the company's "point" blankets. These were sold at HBC trading posts starting the early 18th-century, and were popular among traders for their "wrap" style, which was easy to move and hunt in. It was Hudson's Bay blanket coats which served as a template for the creation of the Canadian Mackinaw jacket.

The English language adopted the French word capote at least as early as 1812.

Habitant capote

In the early 1600s, French sailors traded their capotes to the Micmac in North America. By 1619, the French habitants were also wearing capotes. Fifty years later, the habitants wore an altered form of the capote, possibly based on the then fashionable justacorps, or on the French military uniforms of soldiers stationed in New France at the time, such as the Carignan-Salières Regiment. The altered knee length version had no buttons and was worn with a military sash (Ceinture fléchée). The habitant capot was no longer the sailors' capot nor the soldiers' capote, but something distinct, combining features from both.

Capot is the Quebec French word that described this unique winter jacket. From capot came the verb encapoter or s'encapoter also in Quebec French (meaning to put on a capot and other winter accessories before going out).

Métis capote

"Red stroud" refers to the "Stroudwater Scarlet", cloth produced in the English town of Stroud, which was used for the uniform of the British Army. The Métis capotes of the Red River area were made of leather or wool. Those made of leather were often decorated with beads and silk embroidery in floral designs.  
The wool capotes were of different colors; blue was preferred by the Catholic Métis and white by the Protestant Métis while grey was worn by both. A sash was worn around the waist and a fire bag was either tucked in the folds of the sash or hung around the neck by a shoulder strap. A fire bag was used for carrying flints, steel and tinder to start a fire as well as tobacco, pipe, knife and other personal items as most capotes had no pockets.

William H. Keating described a group of Métis buffalo hunters he encountered at Pembina by the Red River in 1823.

In Canadian culture
In the latter half of the 19th century the blanket coat was popularized amongst the European-descended population of Canada to the extent that it was looked on as national dress.  Blanket coats had been used for some time before by those with outdoor occupations, but in this period the cut and construction of the coat started to follow changing European and American fashions and became more widely used.

The popularity of the coat was part of a wider movement to adopt aspects of the culture of indigenous people in order to establish a Canadian identity that was separate from both British and United States identities.  Two elite groups were important in establishing the blanket coat's popularity.  One was the Montreal Snow Shoe Club, which adopted the blanket coat as required equipment.  Snow shoeing was another activity adopted from indigenous people and for a time became immensely popular as a sport.  The other group was a succession of Governors General of Canada photographed wearing blanket coats.  Perhaps even more significant for spreading the coat as a fashion was its wearing by the wives of Governors General, known as viceregal consorts. Initially considered a male garment, by this period it was being made in versions for women and children.

Gallery

See also
 Mackinaw jacket

References

External links

Cmhg.gc.ca: Compagnies franches de la Marine winter dress between 1690 and 1700
University of Oregon.edu: Metis textiles
Smithsonian Institution.edu: Metis capote (without a hood)
Smithsonian Institution.edu: Portrait of Robert Kennicott in 1862 wearing a Metis/voyageur outfit (see image 4) — in this Carte de visite Robert Kennicott is wearing a double breasted capote with buttons tied at the waist with a metis sash with a marten fur fire-bag tucked in. His pants are trimmed with ribbon on the outside seams and on the cuffs. The pants are tied just below the knees with garters ending in tassels and on his feet are beaded or embroidered moccasins. On his head is a toque.

Native American clothing
Canadian fashion
Fur trade
Métis culture
Culture of Quebec
Hudson's Bay Company